Jürgen Becker (born 10 July 1932, in Cologne) is a German poet, prose writer and radio play author. He won the 2014 Georg Büchner Prize.

Life 
Jürgen Becker's family moved from Cologne to Erfurt in 1939, so that he experienced the war as a child in Thuringia. In 1947, he went to Waldbröl in West Germany. In 1950, he moved back to his native city of Cologne. From 1950 to 1953, he attended a high school there until graduation. He then began studying German, which he broke off in 1954.

From 1959 to 1964, he was a member of the Westdeutscher Rundfunk, and from 1964 to 1966, lecturer in the Rowohlt publishing house. He became a freelance writer in 1968. From 1973, he was director of the Suhrkamp Theater Publishing, and from 1974 to 1993, director of the radio play department in Deutschlandfunk.

Jürgen Becker emerged in the sixties, with a highly experimental kind of literature, which sat on the open form mainly from opposition to conventional narrative. In later texts, the landscape continues to play an important role in Becker's poetry. In addition to the poems that make up his major work, Becker also wrote stories and radio plays. Since 1994, his contributions have appeared in the journal Sinn und Form, edited by the Akademie der Künste (Berlin).

From 1960, Becker was a participant in the group 47, whose literary prize he won at the last meeting of the group in 1967. Since 1969, he has been a member of the PEN Centre Germany and the Academy of Arts (Berlin), since 1974, the German Academy of Language and Poetry, since 1984 the Academy of Sciences and Literature in Mainz, and since 2009 the North Rhine-Westphalian Academy of Sciences, Humanities and the Arts.

In 2012, under the title '"In Hell of Silence" The Author Jürgen Becker', the first documentary about Jürgen Becker appeared, by Christoph Felder, an 80-minute portrait (b / w, publisher Die Neue Sachlichkeit, production CFF) with his own words and some few short excerpts of his colleagues Günter Grass, Uwe Johnson and Hans Magnus Enzensberger (Group 47).

Family 
Becker has been married to the artist Rango Bohne since 1965 and lives near Cologne, in Odenthal. Becker's son is the photographer and filmmaker .

Works 
 Bilder, Häuser, Hausfreunde. Drei Hörspiele. Suhrkamp, Frankfurt 1969; Teilausgabe mit einem *Nachwort des Autors: Häuser. Hörspiel. Reclam, Stuttgart 1972, .
 Umgebungen. Suhrkamp, Frankfurt 1970, .
 Schnee. Gedichte. Literarisches Colloquium, Berlin 1971.
 Eine Zeit ohne Wörter. Suhrkamp, Frankfurt 1971, .
 Die Zeit nach Harrimann. 29 Szenen für Nora, Helen, Jenny und den stummen Diener Moltke. Als Bühnenmanuskript gedruckt. Suhrkamp, Frankfurt 1971.
 Das Ende der Landschaftsmalerei. Gedichte. Suhrkamp, Frankfurt 1974.
 Erzähl mir nichts vom Krieg. Gedichte. Suhrkamp, Frankfurt 1977, .
 In der verbleibenden Zeit. Gedichte. Suhrkamp, Frankfurt 1979, .
 Erzählen bis Ostende. Suhrkamp, Frankfurt 1981, .
 Gedichte 1965–1980. Suhrkamp, Frankfurt 1981, .
 mit Rango Bohne: Fenster und Stimmen. Suhrkamp, Frankfurt 1982, .
 Felder, Ränder, Umgebungen. Suhrkamp, Frankfurt 1983, .
 Die Abwesenden. Drei Hörspiele. Suhrkamp, Frankfurt 1983, .
 Die Türe zum Meer. Suhrkamp, Frankfurt 1983, . Odenthals Küste. Gedichte. Suhrkamp, Frankfurt 1986, .
 Das Gedicht von der wiedervereinigten Landschaft. Suhrkamp, Frankfurt 1988, .
 mit Rango Bohne: Frauen mit dem Rücken zum Betrachter. Suhrkamp, Frankfurt 1989, .
 Das englische Fenster. Gedichte. Suhrkamp, Frankfurt 1990, .
 Beispielsweise am Wannsee. Ausgewählte Gedichte Suhrkamp, Frankfurt 1992, .
 Foxtrott im Erfurter Stadion. Gedichte. Suhrkamp, Frankfurt 1993, .
 Die Gedichte. Suhrkamp, Frankfurt 1995, .
 mit Boris Becker: Geräumtes Gelände. Verlag der Buchhandlung Walther König, Köln 1995, .
 mit Rango Bohne: Korrespondenzen mit Landschaft. Suhrkamp, Frankfurt 1996, .
 Gegend mit Spuren. Hörspiel. Akademie der Künste, Berlin 1996, .
 Der fehlende Rest. Erzählung., Frankfurt 1997, .
 Kaleidoskop der Stimmen. Ein Gespräch mit Leo Kreutzer und das Hörspiel „Bahnhof am Meer“. Wehrhahn, Hannover 1998, .
 Journal der Wiederholungen. Gedichte. Suhrkamp, Frankfurt 1999, .
 Aus der Geschichte der Trennungen. Roman. Suhrkamp, Frankfurt 1999, .
 mit Rango Bohne: Häuser und Häuser. Fünfunddreißig Prosatexte. Suhrkamp, Frankfurt 2002, .
 Schnee in den Ardennen. Journalroman. Suhrkamp, Frankfurt 2003, [6] (= Ein Buch für die Stadt 2009).
 Die folgenden Seiten. Journalgeschichten. Suhrkamp, Frankfurt 2006, .
 Dorfrand mit Tankstelle. Gedichte. Suhrkamp, Frankfurt 2007, .
 Aus der Kölner Bucht. Gedichte. Suhrkamp, Frankfurt 2009, .
 Im Radio das Meer. Journalsätze. Suhrkamp, Frankfurt 2009, .
 Scheunen im Gelände. Gedichte. Mit Collagen von Rango Bohne. Edition Lyrik Kabinett, München 2012, .
 Wie es weiterging. Ein Durchgang – Prosa aus fünf Jahrzehnten. Suhrkamp, Berlin 2012, .
 "Was wir noch wissen. Journal der Augenblicke und Erinnerungen." In: Sinn und Form 4/2013, S. 591–602.
 Jetzt die Gegend damals. Journalroman. Suhrkamp, Berlin 2015, .

Works in English

References

External links 

1932 births
Living people
Writers from Cologne
German poets
Georg Büchner Prize winners